David Goldsmith may refer to:

 David Goldsmith (cricketer) (born 1947), English cricketer
 David Goldsmith (footballer) (born 1993), English footballer
 David Goldsmith (field hockey) (1931–2017), New Zealand field hockey player
 David Goldsmith (actor) (born 1969), American actor
 David Goldsmith (lyricist) (born 1962), American theatre and film music lyricist